Demetrios Giannaros (born October 4, 1949) is an American politician who served in the Connecticut House of Representatives from the 21st district from 1995 to 2011.

References

1949 births
Living people
Democratic Party members of the Connecticut House of Representatives
People from Samos